Events in the year 1979 in Bulgaria.

Incumbents 

 General Secretaries of the Bulgarian Communist Party: Todor Zhivkov
 Chairmen of the Council of Ministers: Stanko Todorov

Events 

 30 May – Parliamentary elections were held in Bulgaria.
 8 September – Construction on the Asparuhov Bridge was completed.

References 

 
1970s in Bulgaria
Years of the 20th century in Bulgaria
Bulgaria
Bulgaria